Oisin Michael McEntee (born 5 January 2001) is an Irish professional footballer who plays for Walsall, as a defender.

Early and personal life
Born in Shercock, McEntee's father was a Gaelic footballer, and McEntee played at youth level for Shercock before concentrating on football. McEntee attended Patrician High School in Carrickmacross.

Club career
McEntee spent his early career with Cootehill, Carrick Rovers, Belvedere and Malahide United. McEntee joined Newcastle United at the age of 16, captaining their under-18 team. He spent time on loan at Greenock Morton before signing for Walsall in May 2022. He underwent shoulder surgery in June 2022.

International career
McEntee is an Irish youth international. He appeared at the 2018 UEFA European Under-17 Championship.

References

2001 births
Living people
Republic of Ireland association footballers
Belvedere F.C. players
Malahide United F.C. players
Newcastle United F.C. players
Greenock Morton F.C. players
Walsall F.C. players
Scottish Professional Football League players
Association football defenders
Republic of Ireland youth international footballers
English Football League players